GoldenEye is a third-person shooter handheld electronic game developed and published by Tiger Electronics, based on the 1995 James Bond film of the same name, released between 1995 and 1998. It pre-dates the more widely known N64 GoldenEye game by 2 years. The game was released in two versions, both small handheld dedicated consoles with a similar gameplay: the player controlled James Bond as he fights enemies loosely based on the ones from the film before a GoldenEye satellite destroyed the city (implied to be London) with its electromagnetic pulse weapon.

Gameplay
The game is available in two different versions: the gamepad variant, with a liquid-crystal display (LCD), a cross-shaped push button and two line-shaped ones and four settings buttons on the lower side of the screen, and the "Grip Games" line variant, shaped like a pistol grip, with a trigger used to shoot and other buttons on the rear. The two editions were slightly different.

Gamepad variant
In the gamepad variant (which has a horizontal LCD screen on the background drawing of a horizontal road on which the protagonist, 007, runs), the main character stays in a centre-left position on the display and the player must move his torso and his legs to shoot other characters, walk or drive a tank. In the five levels ("stages") of the game, Bond must confront Xenia Onatopp and some Russian Army soldiers using the "kick", "Q" (enabling the player to use Q's explosive pen), "punch", "fire" and "right"/"left"/"up" (the "down" button does nothing) buttons of the console. The game's dynamics mimic the film's ones, but no backstory is given.

Grip Games variant
The 1998 Grip Games version of the game (which is LCD is a vertical one on the background picture of a vertical road) resembles a gun grip, powered by three AAA batteries. The trigger can be used to stop or to start the game, while the "on"/"off" and settings buttons are on the rear, facing the player. The LCD is located on the top of the pistol grip. In this edition of GoldenEye, the player is able to choose Bond's weapon between a silenced .22 gun, another pistol, a shotgun, and a machine gun and differs from the gamepad version that Bond must shoot the satellite down.

References

1995 video games
James Bond video games
Tiger Electronics handheld games
Video games developed in the United States